Colma station is a Bay Area Rapid Transit (BART) station located in unincorporated northern San Mateo County, California adjacent to the incorporated town of Colma and city of Daly City.

Colma station is situated in a small valley shared with BART's Daly City Yard and a large parking garage. The station has three tracks, with an island platform between the two eastern tracks and a side platform next to the western track. Only the two eastern tracks are used for revenue service.

History 

Colma was previously served by the Southern Pacific Railroad until passenger trains were discontinued in the early 1900s. The right of way was reused to construct the Daly City BART turn back in the late 1980s and then the extension further into San Mateo County.

The BART station opened on February 24, 1996 as the southernmost extent of the BART system on the San Francisco Peninsula until the extension to San Francisco International Airport and Millbrae opened in 2003.

The station was "prominently featured" in the 2006 film Colma: The Musical.

Bus connections 

References

External links 

BART – Colma

Bay Area Rapid Transit stations in San Mateo County, California
Stations on the Yellow Line (BART)
Stations on the Red Line (BART)
Railway stations in the United States opened in 1996
Bus stations in San Mateo County, California
1996 establishments in California